The Massacre is the sixth studio album by Scottish hardcore punk band The Exploited, released in 1990 through Rough Justice. It is the second crossover thrash album by The Exploited and is the band's most successful album so far.

The intro was taken from the 1978 movie Faces of Death.

Track listing
All songs written by Wattie Buchan, except for where noted.
 "The Massacre" (Buchan, Campbell, Duncan, McCormack) – 3:03
 "Sick Bastard" – 4:05
 "Porno Slut" – 3:15
 "Now I'm Dead" – 3:45
 "Boys in Blue" – 3:58
 "Dog Soldier" – 3:05
 "Don't Pay the Poll Tax" – 4:25
 "Fuck Religion" – 3:12
 "About to Die" (Buchan, Campbell, Duncan, McCormack) – 3:30
 "Blown Out of the Sky" – 4:21
 "Police Shit" – 3:54
 "Stop the Slaughter" – 3:40
2005 CD reissue bonus tracks
 "Scaling the Derry Walls" (live) – 2:09
 "The Massacre" (live) – 1:58
 "About to Die" (live) – 3:05
 "Death Before Dishonour" (live) – 2:12

Personnel
The Exploited
Wattie Buchan – vocals
Gogs – guitar
Smeeks – bass, vocals
Tony – drums
with:
The Driffield Lager Louts – backing vocals
Engineered by Colin Richardson
Produced by Wattie Buchan
Illustration by Terry Oakes

References

1990 albums
The Exploited albums
Albums produced by Colin Richardson